Valerianella ozarkana is a species of flowering plant in the honeysuckle family known by the common name Palmer's cornsalad. It is found in Arkansas and Oklahoma in the United States.

References

Flora of the United States
palmeri